Simon Antony Henig  (born June 1969) is a British politician, former leader of Durham County Council, and since 15 April 2014, chair of the North East Combined Authority (NECA).

Early life
Simon Henig was born in June 1969, the son of the former Labour MP and Lancaster council leader Stanley Henig, and the historian Ruth Henig. Simon's grandfather, Sir Mark Henig, served as Lord Mayor of Leicester and led the English Tourist Board. He was educated at Moorside Primary School, Lancaster, Lancaster Royal Grammar School and Corpus Christi College, Oxford.

Career

Politics
In 1999, Henig was first elected as a councillor in the County Durham town of Chester-le-Street.

From 2001 to 2008, Henig was the agent for North Durham CLP, and chair of the North East Regional Board. In 2007, Henig was runner-up to be the Labour candidate to replace Tony Blair as MP for Sedgefield.

From May 2008 until May 2021, Henig was Leader of Durham County Council. In 2013, Henig led his local Labour Party to a substantially increased majority and a council group of 94, the largest in the UK, although that was reduced to 74 in 2017. He is the chair of the Association of Labour Councillors. Henig is chair of the County Durham Partnership Board, a member of Labour's National Policy Forum and Chair of the Regional Board.

Henig was appointed Commander of the Order of the British Empire (CBE) in the 2016 New Year Honours.

Academia
Henig is a lecturer in politics at the University of Sunderland, specialising in psephology, the branch of political science which deals with the study and scientific analysis of elections.

Publications
Henig's publications include The Political Map of Britain, Politico's Guides to the 2005 and 2010 General Elections and Women and Political Power: Europe since 1945.

Personal life
Henig's wife Katherine was also a Labour councillor, but lost her seat in 2017. She was first elected in 2013, when she took the ward of Chester-le-Street South from the Liberal Democrats. The couple have two children and live in Chester-le-Street. Henig's interests include travel, football and cricket.

References

1969 births
Living people
Academics of the University of Sunderland
Alumni of Corpus Christi College, Oxford
British political scientists
Commanders of the Order of the British Empire
Councillors in County Durham
People educated at Lancaster Royal Grammar School
People from Lancaster, Lancashire
Jewish British politicians
Leaders of local authorities of England